The 2013–14 RCD Espanyol season was the club's 113th season in its history and its 79th in the top-tier.

Squad
As June, 2014..

Squad and statistics

|}

Transfers

Competitions

Overall

La Liga

League table

Copa del Rey

References

RCD Espanyol seasons
Espanyol
Espanyol